Diogo da Rocha was a captain who sailed for the Portuguese in 1525. He is credited as being the first to encounter the islands "to the Eastwards of Mindanao, and the islands of St. Lazarus" ( possibly Ulithi in the Caroline Islands ).

References

Portuguese explorers
16th-century Portuguese people
Portuguese explorers of the Pacific
16th-century explorers
Year of birth missing
Year of death missing